Dinoxyline is a synthetic compound developed for scientific research, which acts as a potent full agonist at all five dopamine receptor subtypes.

References 

Catechols
D1-receptor agonists
D2-receptor agonists
D3 receptor agonists
D4 receptor agonists
D5 receptor agonists